Reginald Levi Mathis (born March 18, 1956) is a former American football linebacker who played two seasons with the New Orleans Saints of the National Football League. He was drafted by the New Orleans Saints in the second round of the 1979 NFL Draft. He played college football at the University of Oklahoma and attended Notre Dame High School in Chattanooga, Tennessee. Mathis was also a member of the New Jersey Generals, San Antonio Gunslingers, Hamilton Tiger-Cats and Detroit Drive.

References

External links
Just Sports Stats

Living people
1956 births
Players of American football from Tennessee
American football linebackers
African-American players of American football
African-American players of Canadian football
Oklahoma Sooners football players
New Orleans Saints players
New Jersey Generals players
San Antonio Gunslingers players
Hamilton Tiger-Cats players
Detroit Drive players
Sportspeople from Chattanooga, Tennessee
21st-century African-American people
20th-century African-American sportspeople